The 1977–78 Coppa Italia was the 31st Coppa Italia, the major Italian domestic cup. The competition was won by Internazionale, who defeated Napoli in a one-legged final played at the Stadio Olimpico in Rome.

First round

Group 1

Group 2

Group 3

Group 4

Group 5

Group 6

Group 7 

Play-off match

Second round 
Join the defending champion: Milan.

Group A

Group B

Final

Top goalscorers

References
rsssf.com

Coppa Italia seasons
Coppa